Zbigniew Gniatkowski (born in Radomsko) is a Polish civil servant and diplomat, and EU official, ambassador of Poland to New Zealand (2014–2020).

Life 
Zbigniew Gniatkowski graduated from John Paul II Catholic University of Lublin Romance studies (1996) and National School of Public Administration in Warsaw (2001).

From 1994 to 1999 he worked as a journalist. In 2001 he entered Ministry of Foreign Affairs. He served at Polish embassies in Paris, Washington, Permanent Representation to the European Union in Brussels (2004–2008, as a Press Counsellor) and European Commission Representation in Warsaw (2008–2014, deputy head since 2013). From 18 August 2014 Gniatkowski served as the ambassador of Poland to New Zealand, he presented his letter of credence to Governor-General of New Zealand Jerry Mateparae on 17 September 2014. Since 2017 accredited also to Kiribati, Tuvalu, Samoa and Tonga. He ended his term on 30 September 2020. 

Upon his return to the Ministry HQs in Warsaw he served in the Department for cooperation with Polish Diaspora, and rejoined the European Commission service in charge of Governance, Strategic Coordination and Disinformation response.

Besides Polish, he speaks English, French, and Spanish.

References 

1972 births
Ambassadors of Poland to New Zealand
John Paul II Catholic University of Lublin alumni
Living people

National School of Public Administration (Poland) alumni
People from Radomsko